The following is a list of cricketers from the Kolkata Knight Riders. It includes players to have featured for the team in one or more matches across IPL and CLT20.

Players
Last Updated on 19 July 2020

Sources: IPLT20.com and
ESPNCricinfo

Captains 
Last Updated on 19 July 2020

Source: ESPNCricinfo

References